The 2021–22 Syracuse Orange women's basketball team represented Syracuse University during the 2021–22 NCAA Division I women's basketball season. The Orange were led by interim head coach Vonn Read. The Orange are ninth year members of the Atlantic Coast Conference and played their home games at the Carrier Dome in Syracuse, New York.

Previous head coach Quentin Hillsman resigned amid investigations into allegations of inappropriate behavior on August 2, 2021.  Associate Head Coach Vonn Read was named the interim head coach for the 2021–2022 season on August 4, 2021.

The Orange finished the season 11–18 overall and 4–14 in ACC play to finish in a tie for eleventh place.  As the twelfth seed in the ACC tournament, they lost to Clemson in their First Round matchup.  They were not invited to the NCAA tournament or the WNIT.

Previous season

The Orange finished the season 15–9 and 9–7 in ACC play to finish in a tie for fourth place.  As the fifth seed in the ACC tournament, they defeated to Boston College in the Second Round and Florida State in the Quarterfinals before losing to Louisville in the Semifinals.  They received an at-large bid to the NCAA tournament where they were the eight seed in the Riverwalk Regional.  In the tournament they defeated nine seed South Dakota State in the First Round before losing to one seed UConn to end their season.

Off-season

Departures

Incoming Transfers

Recruiting Class

Source:

Roster

Schedule

Source:

|-
!colspan=6 style="background:#D44500; color:#212B6D;"| Regular Season

|-
!colspan=6 style="background:#D44500; color:#212B6D;"| ACC Women's Tournament

Rankings

Coaches did not release a Week 2 poll and AP does not release a poll after the NCAA tournament.

See also
 2021–22 Syracuse Orange men's basketball team

References

Syracuse Orange women's basketball seasons
Syracuse
Syracuse basketball, women
Syracuse basketball, women